Phalonidia ochrochraon is a species of moth of the family Tortricidae. It is found in Pará, Brazil.

The wingspan is about 8 mm. The ground colour of the forewings is ochreous creamy, but creamy in the distal half of the wing. The suffusions are brownish ochreous and the markings are rust brown. The hindwings are brown.

References

Moths described in 2002
Phalonidia